Poors Allotment is a   nature reserve north of Camberley in Surrey. It is owned by Windlesham United Charities and managed by the Surrey Wildlife Trust. It is part of Thames Basin Heaths Special Protection Area and Broadmoor to Bagshot Woods and Heaths Site of Special Scientific Interest.

This site got its name because it was set aside under an early nineteenth century Enclosure Act to allow poor people to gather turf and bracken as fuel. It has heath, acid grassland and woods. Its importance lies in its fauna, such as woodlarks, nightjars, Dartford warblers,  adders and several species of butterfly.

References

Surrey Wildlife Trust